State Employees Credit Union of Maryland (also known as SECU of Maryland or SECU Maryland or SECU MD) is a state-chartered credit union headquartered in Linthicum, Maryland. It is the largest non-profit credit union and it is regulated; under the authority of The Office of the Commissioner of Financial Regulation, State of Maryland.

History 
SECU Maryland began its operation in the year 1951 with the then-Governor Theodore McKeldin as its first member. In the spring of 1953, it opened its first office. And from 1959 to 1975, its operational head office moved within Baltimore multiple times. Finally, by 1979–80, SECU Maryland moved its headquarters in Towson. During the same period, it crossed the 50,000th membership enrollment mark. Currently, the new headquarters are located at Linthicum, Maryland

As of June 2020, SECU Maryland has over $4 billion in assets and over 260,000 members. Its ATM distribution network spread out at 55 branches and 54 remote locations across the state of Maryland. The member deposits are insured by National Credit Union Administration (NCUA) of the U.S. federal government.

Community support programs 
In 2007, SECU Maryland created a foundation to support the educational goals of its members by providing scholarships. The scholarships are available to any SECU MD member who is pursuing higher education and meets the qualifications. Annual scholarships are generally awarded to 26 recipients enrolling for two or four years of college or university programs; including trade and technical schools.

In 2020, to overcome the on-going COVID-19 pandemic in Maryland, SECU Maryland Foundation created multiple grants and aid programs for local businesses and nonprofits as a part of  COVID-19 community relief efforts.

Other programs 
On June 19, 2013, SECU Maryland Foundation-sponsored SECU Arena, a 5,200-seat multi-purpose a sports complex; was inaugurated on the Towson University campus. It eventually replaced Towson Center. It hosts the men's and women's basketball teams, as well as the respective volleyball and gymnastics teams.

References 

Credit unions based in Maryland
1951 establishments in Maryland
Banks based in Maryland